Guignard is a surname. Notable people with the surname include:

Alberto da Veiga Guignard (1896–1962), Brazilian artist
Alexis Guignard, comte de Saint-Priest (1805–1851), French diplomat and historian
André Guignard, Swiss engineer initially educated as a watchmaker
Armand Charles Emmanuel Guignard, comte de Saint-Priest (1782–1863), French aristocrat
Christelle Guignard (born 1962), retired French alpine skier
Emmanuel Louis Marie Guignard, vicomte de Saint-Priest (1789–1881), French politician and diplomat during the Bourbon Restoration
Eric J. Guignard (born 1975), author and publisher
François-Emmanuel Guignard, comte de Saint-Priest (1735–1821), French politician and diplomat during the Ancien Régime and French Revolution
Guillaume Emmanuel Guignard, vicomte de Saint-Priest (1776–1814), French émigré general who fought in the Russian army
Léon Guignard (1852–1928), French botanist and pharmacist
Jazz Guignard, popular Haitian jazz musician in the 1930s

See also
Château Lamothe-Guignard, sweet white wine
Guignard University of Art of Minas Gerais, university of fine arts in Brazil